This is the discography of English post-punk and electronic band Section 25.

Albums

Studio albums

Live albums

Remix albums

Compilation albums

Box sets

Video albums

EPs

Singles

References

Discographies of British artists
Rock music group discographies